Mohamed Sendid (born in Oran) is a former Algerian football referee. He was a referee at the 1992 Summer Olympic Games, as well as FIFA World Cup qualifiers.

References

People from Oran
Living people
Algerian football referees
Olympic football referees
Year of birth missing (living people)
21st-century Algerian people